The Catholic Church in Finland is part of the worldwide Catholic Church, under the spiritual leadership of the Pope in Rome.

As of 2018, there were more than 15,000 registered Catholics in Finland out of a total population of 5.5 million. There were also an estimated 10,000 unregistered Catholics in the country. Of the more than 6000 Catholic families in the country, half were Finnish and the rest from the international community. Due to the small number of Catholics in Finland, the whole country forms a single diocese, the Catholic Diocese of Helsinki.

As of 2018, there were five native-born Finnish priests, three of whom work in Finland. There are more than 30 priests from different countries serving in Finland. Since the 2019 retirement of Teemu Sippo, the first native-born Finnish Catholic Bishop since the Lutheran Reformation, the Catholic Diocese of Helsinki has been vacant, i.e. without a bishop.

The Catholic Church in Finland is active in ecumenical matters and is a member of the Finnish Ecumenical Council, even though the worldwide Catholic Church is not a member of the World Council of Churches.

History

Catholicism was the first form of Christianity introduced into the area of present-day Finland. The earliest finds of Western-Christian (Catholic) artefacts date from the 11th to the 12th centuries. In the 16th century, Finland, as part of Sweden, took part in the Lutheran Reformation after which Catholicism lost almost all ground in the area.

The first Catholic religious service following the death of the Catholic King John III of Sweden in 1592 was celebrated in 1796 by the Apostolic Vicar of Sweden, the Italian-born Father Paolo Moretti.  

A parish was established in 1799 in Vyborg in the Russian part of Old Finland. After the rest of Finland became part of the Russian Empire in 1812, the parish covered the whole Grand Duchy of Finland. There were about 3000 Catholics in 1830. Until the 1860s, all the priests serving in Finland were Lithuanian Dominicans. The parish of Helsinki was founded in 1856, possibly due to the influence of the Governor General Friedrich Wilhelm von Berg's Italian wife, Leopoldina Cicogna Mozzoni (1786 -Warsaw 17 February 1874). St. Henry's Cathedral in Helsinki was finished in 1860.

In 1882 all the German priests and nuns were expelled. All foreign priests were expelled again in 1912. After Finland's independence and the departure of Russian military forces, which had included many Poles and Lithuanians, the Catholic Church lost most of its members. 

In 1920 an apostolic vicariate was established in Finland. A parish in Turku was established in 1926, and in 1927 a parish in Terijoki. The Government granted the Catholic Church in Finland the status of religious community in 1929. Finland established diplomatic relations with the Holy See in 1942 and Pope Pius XII donated a significant sum of money to Finnish war orphans.  After the war, the parishes in Vyborg and Terijoki, which had been located in territories that were ceded to the USSR, were moved to Lahti, and a new parish was founded in 1949 in Jyväskylä.

The Church of the Assumption of Mary was finished in Helsinki in 1954. The following year the apostolic vicariate was raised to a diocese. A parish in Tampere was established in 1957, a parish in Kouvola in 1985, and a parish in Oulu in 1992.

Catholic Church movements and groups are also active in Finland. One of these, the Neocatechumenal Way has established two Redemptoris Mater seminaries in Finland and maintains a presence both in Helsinki and in other towns, most notably Oulu.

A notable Catholic Finn in the early 21st century is the former head of the nationalist Finns Party, Timo Soini.

Bishops

Bishops of Turku 

 Henrik, 1134–1158
 Rodolfus, 1202?–1209?
 Folkvinus, 1210?–1234?
 Tuomas, 1234?–1245
 Bero, 1248 tai 1249–1258
 Ragvald I, 1258–1266
 Catillus, 1266–1286
 Johannes, 1286–1290
 Maunu I, 1291–1308
 Ragvald II, 1309–1321
 Pentti Gregoriuksenpoika, 1321–1338
 Hemming, 1338–1366
 Henrik Hartmaninpoika, 1366–1367
 Johannes Pietarinpoika, 1367–1370
 Johannes Westfal, 1370–1385
 Bero Balk, 1385–1412
 Maunu Olavinpoika Tavast, 1412–1450
 Olavi Maununpoika, 1450–1460
 Konrad Bitz, 1460–1489
 Maunu III Särkilahti, 1489–1500
 Laurentius Michaelis, 1500–1506
 Johannes IV Olofsson, 1506–1510
 Arvid Kurck, 1510–1522
 Ericus Svenonius, 1523–1527
 Martti Skytte, 1528–1550

Bishops from 1923 
Before the year 1955, Finland was a apostolic vicariate headed by an apostolic vicar, who was technically not the Bishop of Helsinki, but the titular bishop of a titular see, which is a defunct Roman Catholic diocese.

Apostolic Vicars of Finland 1923–1955

Bishops of Helsinki 1955–

Churches

There are eight Catholic parishes in Finland:

 St. Henry's Cathedral, Helsinki (Sub Centres - Tapanila (Vantaa), Porvoo)
St. Brigit & Blessed Hemming Church, Turku (Sub Centres - Åland, Eurajoki, Pori)
St. Olav's Church, Jyväskylä
St. Mary's Church, Helsinki (Sub Centres - Olari (Espoo), Hyvinkää, Karis)
Holy Cross Church, Tampere (Sub Centres - Hämeenlinna, Kokkola, Kristinestad, Jakobstad, Seinäjoki, Vaasa)
St. Ursula's Church, Kouvola (Sub Centres - Hamina, Kotka, Lahti, Lappeenranta)
Holy Family of Nazareth Church, Oulu (Sub Centres - Rovaniemi, Tornio, Kemi, Kajaani)
St. Joseph's Church, Kuopio (Sub Centres - Mikkeli, Savonlinna, Joensuu, Lieksa)

Masses are also celebrated at the sub centres of the above parishes and some Lutheran and Orthodox Churches on alternative weeks. There is a Catholic Church training centre named Stella Maris in Lohja.

There is a high demand for establishing a new parish in Northern Finland at Rovaniemi which is a major tourist destination in Lapland.

Religious orders
The Bridgettine order is active in Finland with convents in Turku and Koisjärvi, near Lohja. A Carmelite convent, the Monastery of Our Lady of Mount Carmel in Finland was established in Espoo in 1988. The Dominican friars run a house in central Helsinki, home to a large library specializing in Christian studies and ecumenism named Studium Catholicum.

The relics of Bishop Henrik
The ownership of the relics of Bishop Henrik caused some controversy between the National Board of Antiquities, the Catholic Church in Finland, and the Evangelical Lutheran Church of Finland. In 1998 the pastor of the Cathedral of Saint Henry in Helsinki wished to relocate Henrik's relics to the Cathedral, although they were previously exhibited in the Lutheran Cathedral of Turku. The National Board of Antiquities eventually chose to place the relics in the Cathedral of Saint Henry in Helsinki.

Liturgical languages 
Because half of the Roman Catholics in Finland are members of the international community, the Catholic Mass is regularly celebrated in 20 other languages in addition to Finnish. The languages beyond Finnish in which the Mass is celebrated include Swedish, English, Polish, Vietnamese, Tagalog, Italian, Spanish, Portuguese, German, Malayalam, Tamil and Hungarian.

See also
Catholic Diocese of Helsinki
List of Catholic dioceses in Finland
St. Henry's Cathedral
St. Mary's Church, Helsinki

References

Works cited

External links
Catholic Church in Finland
Bridgettine Sisters in Finland